Michael Frey may refer to:
 Michael Frey (politician), politician from Virginia
 Michael Frey (footballer) (born 1994), Swiss footballer
 Michael Frey (composer) (1787–1832), German composer-conductor